Rack Room Shoes is an American footwear retailer headquartered in Charlotte, North Carolina, which operates more than 500 stores in 36 states under the Rack Room Shoes and Off Broadway Shoe Warehouse brands.

Both brands offer a variety of styles for women, men and children in athletic, comfort and dress categories, as well as accessories, backpacks, shoe care items, and socks.

The company owns private label footwear brands including: Bjorndal, Bluefin, Cupcake Couture, Xappeal, Limelight, Restoration, Lauren Blakwell, Pesaro, West Harris, and Michael by Michael Shannon.

History 
The company was founded in 1922 in Salisbury, North Carolina by Phil Levinson, who sold his Phil's Shoe stores to his son-in-law, Mort Lerner, who was the owner of Lerner's Shoes. Mort Lerner changed the name of the stores to Rack Room Shoes. In 1984, Rack Room Shoes was purchased  by the privately held Deichmann Group of Germany., Europe's largest and most well-known shoe retailer. Rack Room Shoes will celebrate its 100-year anniversary in 2022.

Rack Room Shoes purchased Off Broadway Shoe Warehouse in 2002 and completed bringing operating functions of Off Broadway Shoe Warehouse, together with its own in 2021. The move allows the retailer's customers to earn loyalty points through one program, shop one ecommerce site, and pick-up, return and exchange merchandise at either of the brands’ locations.

Company focus 
In 2016, Rack Room Shoes launched the Athletic Shop, with an increased emphasis on its widespread athletic offering. The Athletic Shop is a shop-within-a-shop concept in brick and mortar stores and e-commerce spaces.

Beginning in 2006 Rack Room Shoes featured real customers as models in all its seasonal advertisements. Over the years the brand has featured Real Families, Real Friends, Real Kids, and in 2020 debuted Real Heroes to shine a spotlight on essential workers in celebration of their dedication to helping others.

Through Rack Room Shoes Gives, an ongoing philanthropic program, the company provides a variety of ways in which customers and associates can seek support for charitable organizations, instilling trust and inspiration in the communities they serve. Since 2007, Rack Room Shoes has partnered with the non-profit organization Shoes That Fit. During the 13-year partnership, Rack Room Shoes has raised more than $9.4 million and donated more than 350,000 pairs of shoes to children in need.

In 2021, Rack Room Shoes announced steps to take a stand against systemic racism and injustices that continue to affect the BIPOC community. The footwear retailer committed to a $1 million diversity plan, that includes implicit bias training, scholarships, internship opportunities, and other donations for education and economic development.

References

Shoe companies of the United States
American companies established in 1920
Retail companies established in 1920
Footwear retailers of the United States
Companies based in Charlotte, North Carolina
1920 establishments in North Carolina